Kayōmon'in no Echizen (嘉陽門院越前, dates unknown) was a waka poet and Japanese noblewoman active in the Kamakura period. Her work appears in a large number of imperial poetry collections, including Shingoshūi Wakashū, Senzai Wakashū, Shokugosen Wakashū, Gyokuyō Wakashū, Shinsenzai Wakashū, Shinchokusen Wakashū, and others. She was a member of the Ōnakatomi clan. She is also known as Ise no Nyōbō (伊勢女房).

External links 
E-text of her poems in Japanese

Japanese poets
Japanese women poets
Year of birth unknown
Year of death unknown
People of Kamakura-period Japan